Álvaro Monjardino (born 6 October 1930, in Angra do Heroísmo) is a lawyer and Portuguese politician.

Early life
He attained his Licenciatura in Law, as well as the Curso Complementar de Ciências Jurídicas (Complimentary Course in Judicial Sciences) before beginning his career in politics.

Career
He was elected as an independent deputy for the National Assembly in the Estado Novo regime, under the banner of the ANP, for the district of Angra do Heroísmo, between 1973 and 1974.

He joined the Junta Regional dos Açores (Regional Junta of the Azores) in the Social Democratic (PSD) party, elected for the constituencies of Graciosa and, later Terceira.

He became the first and third elected presidents of the Legislative Assembly of the Azores, between 1976 and 1984, with a pause between 1978 and 1979, when he occupied the position of Minister Adjunct to the Prime Minister, during the Fourth Constitutional Government, between 1978 and 1979. He would return to hold the position of president of the Regional Assembly from 1979 to 1984.

Later life
He is described as a historian and studious investigator in judicial matters, publishing various documents on the subject. At one time he was president of the council of the Instituto Histórico da Ilha Terceira (1984-1999), as well as a correspondence partner of the Portuguese Academy of History. He was one of the principals involved in the classification of the historical centre of Angra do Heroísmo as a World Heritage Site by UNESCO.

He was a director, collaborator and correspondent for the daily newspaper A União.

He maintains a law office in the old city, and is an administrator/director of several businesses.

References

People from Angra do Heroísmo
Presidents of the Legislative Assembly of the Azores
1940 births
Living people
Government ministers of Portugal